Vyacheslav Ivanovich Lyogkiy (born 10 August 1946 in Baku) is an Azerbaijani football coach and a former player.

External links
 

1946 births
Footballers from Baku
Living people
Soviet footballers
Soviet football managers
Azerbaijani footballers
Azerbaijani football managers
FC Anzhi Makhachkala managers
Association football defenders
Neftçi PFK players
FC Dynamo Makhachkala players
Soviet Top League players